The Big Bounce is a 1960 American film directed and written by Jerry Fairbanks. It follows Project Echo and was financed by Bell Labs.

External links
 
 

1960 films
American documentary films
1960 documentary films
Documentary films about outer space
Bell Labs
Sponsored films
Communications satellites
Documentary films about technology
Promotional films
1960s English-language films
1960s American films